The Ryan Aeronautical Company was founded by T. Claude Ryan in San Diego, California, in 1934. It became part of Teledyne in 1969, and of Northrop Grumman when the latter company purchased Ryan in 1999. Ryan built several historically and technically significant aircraft, including four innovative V/STOL designs, but its most successful production aircraft was the Ryan Firebee line of unmanned drones used as target drones and unmanned air vehicles.

Early history
In 1922, T.C. Ryan founded a flying service in San Diego that would lead to several aviation ventures bearing the Ryan name, including Ryan Airline Company founded in 1925.

T.C. Ryan, whose previous companies were best known for building Charles Lindbergh's transatlantic Spirit of St. Louis, actually had no part in building the famous aircraft.  Ryan had been owner or partner in several previous companies, one of which also bore the name Ryan Aeronautical. The Spirit of St. Louis was not built by the final Ryan Aeronautical entity.

The new company's first aircraft was the S-T Sport Trainer, a low-wing tandem-seat monoplane with a  Menasco B-4 Pirate straight-4 engine. Five were built before production switched to the Ryan ST-A Aerobatic with a more powerful   Menasco C-4 in 1935. This aircraft now had enough power for aerobatic display, and it won the 1937 International Aerobatic Championships. A further improved ST-A Special was built in 1936, with a supercharged  Menasco C-4S.

In 1937 and 1938, a second civilian aircraft model was introduced, the S-C Sport Coupe, or SC-W with a Warner Super Scarab radial engine. The SC-W was a larger three-seater aircraft with a sliding canopy and side-by-side front seating. The prototype SC-M was originally powered by a Menasco C-4 inline engine, however testing revealed that more power was needed. Thirteen examples of the SC-W were built, although the last one was assembled from surplus parts decades after the initial production run was finished.

USAAC trainers 
Interest from the United States Army Air Corps followed. The Menasco engines proved unreliable, and instead Kinner radial engines were fitted. Aircraft were produced as the PT-16 (15 built); PT-20 (30 built); PT-21 (100 USAAF, 100 USN); and finally as the definitive PT-22 Recruit (1,048 built) ordered in 1941 as pilot training began its rapid expansion.

Ryan also pioneered STOL techniques in its YO-51 Dragonfly observation craft. Three prototypes were built, but no USAAF order materialized.

Postwar 

In the immediate postwar years, Ryan diversified, including even building coffins for a short period. It bought the rights to the Navion light aircraft from North American Aviation in 1947, selling it to both military and civilian customers.

Ryan became involved in the missile and unmanned aircraft fields, developing the Ryan Firebee unmanned target drone, the Ryan Firebird (the first American air-to-air missile) among others, as well as a number of experimental and research aircraft.

Ryan acquired a 50% stake in Continental Motors Corporation, the aircraft-engine builder, in 1965.

In the 1950s, Ryan was a pioneer in jet vertical flight with the X-13 Vertijet, a tail-sitting jet with a delta wing which was not used in production designs. In the early 1960s, Ryan built the XV-5 Vertifan for the U.S. Army, which used wing- and nose-mounted lift vanes for V/STOL vertical flight. It was flown, crashing after ingesting a test rescue dummy in its fans, and was not made into a production aircraft. Other Ryan V/STOL designs included the VZ-3 Vertiplane and the YO-51 Dragonfly.

In 1966/67, Ryan was awarded the contract to build the digital Doppler radar system installed aboard the Apollo Lunar Lander.

In 1968, the company was acquired by Teledyne for $128 million and a year later became a wholly owned subsidiary of that company as Teledyne Ryan. Claude Ryan retired as chairman with the Teledyne purchase.

Northrop Grumman purchased Teledyne Ryan in 1999, with the products continuing to form the core of that firm's unmanned aerial vehicle efforts.

Aircraft

Missiles 
 AAM-A-1 Firebird
 ADM-160 MALD

See Also 
 Ryan Airfield

References

External links

 Ryan Aeronautical – Port of San Diego
 Ryan Aeronautical Collection – San Diego Air & Space Museum
 The Ryan Aeronautical Photo Collection – Flickr

Northrop Grumman
Manufacturing companies based in San Diego
Defunct companies based in California
Defunct aircraft manufacturers of the United States
1934 establishments in California
Manufacturing companies established in 1934